897 Lysistrata  is a minor planet orbiting the Sun that was discovered by German astronomer Max Wolf on August 3, 1918.

This is a member of the dynamic Maria family of asteroids that most likely formed as the result of a collisional breakup of a parent body.

References

External links
 
 

000897
Discoveries by Max Wolf
Named minor planets
Aristophanes
000897
000897
19180803